The Fernmeldeturm Nürnberg, the tallest structure in Bavaria, is a telecommunication tower in Nuremberg, southern Germany. Also called the Nürnberger Ei ("Egg of Nuremberg")  because of its egg-shaped tower basket in a height of 185 metres, it is 292 metres high and was built between 1977 and 1980 according to blueprints by architect Erwin Heinle.

The tower basket accommodates transmission mechanisms for Frequency modulation, DAB, UMTS, pager, amateur radio and a microwave radio relay link and – closed since 1991 – a rotating restaurant and a prospect platform. Responsible operator is the DFMG Deutsche Funkturm (German radio tower) GmbH, a subsidiary of Deutsche Telekom based in Münster. From 22 January 2003 to 4 April 2003 the Nürnberg telecommunication tower also served for the spreading of the program of megaradio on mediumwave frequency 945 kHz. For this a wire antenna was strung along the tower shaft, from the top of the tower to the roof of an operating building near the tower.

Since July 2009 a 360° Panoramacamera shows the view over Nuremberg from 194 metres.

Forerunner
From 1927 to 1969, broadcasting programs in medium wave were emitted by the Transmitter Nuremberg-Kleinreuth at the former Rundfunkstraße (Broadcast street) 24. This transmitter was laid to the radio emitting station of the Bayerischer Rundfunk (Bavarian Broadcasting Company) on 15 September 1969 on the Dillberg mountain (see: Dillberg transmitter) where the broadcasting programs of the Bavarian Broadcasting Company are still emitted.

Technical data

Total height: 292.80 m / 960 ft. (as of 9 April 2005)
Total weight: 23,000 t
Maximum diameter of the tower basket: 32.00 m /105 ft.
Height of the tower basket: 49.70 m / 163 ft.
Height of the restaurant floor: 189 m / 620 ft.
Stairs to the prospect platform: 1,170
Stairs and staves to the top: 1,455
Lift velocity (up to 30 persons): 7 m/s / 23 ft/sec
Material lift velocity (up to 13 persons): 2 m/s / 7 ft/sec
Construction time: 12 July 1977 (laying of the foundation stone) to 8 August 1980 (official opening)

DVB-T-Channels from the Fernmeldeturm Nürnberg

See also
List of towers
List of masts
German Wikipedia article on Fernmeldeturm Nürnberg

References

External links
 
 http://skyscraperpage.com/cities/?buildingID=447

Towers completed in 1980
Buildings and structures in Nuremberg
Towers with revolving restaurants
Communication towers in Germany
1980 establishments in West Germany